The Russian First League 1992 was the 1st edition of Russian First Division. There were 3 zones with 52 teams in total.

West

Overview

Standings

Top goalscorers 
26 goals
  Gocha Gogrichiani (FC Zhemchuzhina-Amerus Enterprises Sochi)

19 goals
 Eduard Kugotov (PFC Spartak Nalchik)

17 goals
 Nikolai Sukhov (FC Torpedo Vladimir)

16 goals
 Konstantin Kamnev (FC Terek Grozny)

14 goals
 Artur Shamrin (FC Metallurg Lipetsk)

13 goals
 Yuri Bobryshev (FC Uralan Elista)
 Yuri Krivolapov (FC Tekstilshchik Ivanovo)
 Yevgeni Saprykin (FC Spartak Anapa)
 Igor Tikhonov (FC Tekstilshchik Ivanovo)

12 goals
 Valeri Popov (FC Torpedo Taganrog)

Center

Overview

Standings

Top goalscorers 
27 goals
 Oleg Teryokhin (FC Sokol Saratov)

26 goals
 Sergei Chesnakas (FC Lada Togliatti)
 Viktor Panchenko (FC KAMAZ Naberezhnye Chelny)

21 goals
 Vladimir Filimonov (FC Zvezda Perm)

19 goals
 Dmitri Petrenko (FC Torpedo Volzshky)

18 goals
 Marat Mulashev (FC Rubin-TAN Kazan)

16 goals
 Andrei Ivanov (FC Zenit Izhevsk)

14 goals
  Garnik Avalyan (FC Torpedo Ryazan)
 Mikhail Potylchak (FC Torpedo Volzshky)

13 goals
 Salekh Abdulkayumov (FC Torpedo Ryazan)

East

Overview

Standings

Top goalscorers 
19 goals
 Vyacheslav Kartashov (FC Irtysh Omsk)

13 goals
 Vladimir Misyuchenko (FC Dynamo Yakutsk)
 Vladislav Yarkin (FC Kuzbass Kemerovo)

12 goals
 Aleksandr Alfyorov (FC Zvezda-Yunis-Sib Irkutsk)

11 goals
 Vadim Bogdanov (FC Metallurg Krasnoyarsk)
 Sergei Kovalyov (FC Chkalovets-FoKuMiS Novosibirsk)

10 goals
 Vladislav Kadyrov (FC Sakhalin Yuzhno-Sakhalinsk)

9 goals
 Maksim Dubovik (FC Luch Vladivostok)
 Yevgeni Kasyanenko (FC Luch Vladivostok)
 Vladimir Puzanov (FC Chkalovets-FoKuMiS Novosibirsk)
 Sergei Rogalevskiy (FC Kuzbass Kemerovo)
 Andrei Seroshtan (FC Metallurg Novokuznetsk)
 Andrei Skovpen (FC Kuzbass Kemerovo)

See also
Russian Top League 1992
Russian Second League 1992

References
 Russian First League 1992 on KLISF

2
Russian First League seasons
Russia
Russia